Aleksei Olegovich Pavlishin (born 5 September 1995) is a Russian football player. He plays for FC Volgar Astrakhan.

Club career
He made his debut in the Russian Football National League for FC Volgar Astrakhan on 21 May 2016 in a game against FC Sibir Novosibirsk.

References

External links
 Profile by Russian Football National League

1995 births
Sportspeople from Astrakhan
Living people
Russian footballers
Association football midfielders
FC Volgar Astrakhan players
FC Smena Komsomolsk-na-Amure players
Russian First League players
Russian Second League players